Nathan Michael Shawn Wanya is the fifth album by R&B group Boyz II Men in 2000. It was their first LP on which they received more creative control, and their only LP for Universal Records. Its two singles, "Pass You By" and "Thank You in Advance", performed below expectations on the charts.

Track listing 

Credits adapted from liner notes.

Charts

Weekly charts

Year-end charts

Certifications

References

External links 
 Boyz II Men official website

2000 albums
Boyz II Men albums
Universal Records albums
Albums recorded at Westlake Recording Studios